Peter Berry (20 September 1933 – 8 October 2016) was an English professional footballer who played as a forward. He made a total of 189 Football League appearances for Crystal Palace and Ipswich Town scoring 33 goals. He was the younger brother of Johnny Berry (1926–1994), of  Manchester United and England, whose career was ended by the Munich air disaster.

Playing career
Berry was born in Aldershot in Hampshire, the son of Mary (née O'Connor) and Reginald Berry, a Sergeant in the RHA; he lived with his family on Crimea Road.

Berry began his youth career at Crystal Palace and signed professional terms in August 1951. However his career was then interrupted by National Service and he did not make his debut until January 1954. He began his career as a winger but played mainly as an inside forward and could also play at centre forward. Over the following four seasons Berry was a regular in the Palace first team making a total of 151 League appearances, scoring 27 times. In May 1958, Berry was signed, together with Palace colleague Jimmy Belcher for Ipswich Town, by then manager Alf Ramsay. However, in September 1959, Berry suffered an injury which would ultimately end his career and he retired as a result of this in June 1961, after 38 appearances (6 goals) for Ipswich.

Post retirement
After retiring as a player, Berry set up a sports shop during the 1960s, working in partnership with his brother Johnny in Cove, Hampshire. His brother had survived the Munich crash of 1958 but his injuries were too severe for him to resume his playing career, and returned to his native Hampshire within a few years. He died in his native Aldershot in Hampshire in 2016 aged 83.

References

External links

Peter Berry at holmesdale.net
Peter Berry at Pride of Anglia; Ipswich Town Football Club

1933 births
2016 deaths
Sportspeople from Aldershot
English footballers
Association football forwards
Crystal Palace F.C. players
Ipswich Town F.C. players
English Football League players